The 1893 Primera División was the 2nd season in top-flight football in Argentina and the first organized by current Argentine Football Association, established that same year by Alexander Watson Hutton, considered "the father" of Argentine football.

Only Buenos Aires and Rosario Railway survived from the 1891 championship.

The championship took the format of a league of 5 teams, with each team playing each of the others twice. Lomas Athletic Club won its first league title.

Final table

References

Argentine Primera División seasons
1893 in Argentine football
1893 in South American football